Cordana musae is an ascomycete fungus that is a plant pathogen. It produces cordana leaf spot on bananas.

External links 

 Index Fungorum
 USDA ARS Fungal Database

Ascomycota enigmatic taxa
Fungal plant pathogens and diseases
Banana diseases